The Roman Catholic Diocese of Malindi is a diocese located in the city of Malindi in the Ecclesiastical province of Mombasa in Kenya.

History
 June 2, 2000: Established as Diocese of Malindi from the Diocese of Garissa and Metropolitan Archdiocese of Mombasa.

Ordinaries
Bishops of Malindi (Roman rite)
Bishop Francis Baldacchino (2 Jun 2000 – 9 Oct 2009; died)
Bishop Emanuel Barbara (8 July 2011 – 5 January 2018; died)
Bishop Wilybard Lagho (28 December 2020 – )

See also
Roman Catholicism in Kenya
Kenya Conference of Catholic Bishops

Notes

Sources
GCatholic.org

Malindi
Roman Catholic dioceses in Kenya
Christian organizations established in 2000
Roman Catholic dioceses and prelatures established in the 20th century
Roman Catholic Ecclesiastical Province of Mombasa